Sins of Silence is a 1996 American drama television film directed by Sam Pillsbury and written by Shelley Evans, from a story by Evans and Kathryn Montgomery. Inspired by actual events, the film stars Holly Marie Combs and Lindsay Wagner. Though set in San Diego, California, it was filmed in Toronto. The film was broadcast on February 20, 1996, in the United States by CBS.

Plot
Molly McKinley, a former nun now employed, and grossly underfunded, as a rape counselor. A teenager named Sophie seeks out Molly's help after she is raped by the scion of a wealthy family. Refusing to release a confidential file that would reveal Sophie's past promiscuity, and thus seriously compromise her case against her assailant, Molly is sent to jail. The problem now becomes two-pronged: If Molly wants to be released, she must hand over information that may allow the rapist to go free; and if Sophie doesn't speak up, Molly's future career will be destroyed.

Cast
 Holly Marie Combs - Sophie DiMatteo
 Lindsay Wagner - Molly McKinley
 Cynthia Sikes - Cynthia Hayes
 Laura Bertram - Carrie
 Sean McCann - Lee Keating
 Victor Argo - Nick DiMatteo
 Brian Kerwin - Joey Finn
 Jason Cadieux - Tommy Bickley
 Chris Wiggins - Father Flannigan
 Colin Fox - Judge Boland
 Deborah Burgess - Anchorwoman
 Christina Cox - Volunteer
 Suzanne Coy - Prison Guard
 Norma Dell'Agnese - Mohawk
 Richard Fitzpatrick - Jonas
 Gabriel Hogan - Restaurant Patron
 Larry Reynolds - Old Man
 Jason Weinberg - Resident

References

External links
 

1996 films
1996 drama films
American drama television films
American films based on actual events
CBS network films
Drama films based on actual events
Films about rape in the United States
Films directed by Sam Pillsbury
Films set in San Diego
Films shot in Toronto
Television films based on actual events
1990s American films